Randiha (also spelled Rondia) is a village in Galsi I CD block in Bardhaman Sadar North subdivision of Purba Bardhaman district in the Indian state of West Bengal.

Geography

Weir
In 1932, the Anderson weir was constructed at Randiha. As a result, irrigation facility has been available in the lower Damodar basin before the advent of dams by means of the diversion weir on the Damodar and Eden canal to the extent of 890 square kilometres in the districts of Burdwan and Hooghly. Detailed examination of flow data as available at Randiha, revealed that maximum flow of  had occurred twice in August 1913 and August 1935 before the implementation of Damodar Valley Scheme.

Picnic spot

It is a picnic spot.

Eden Canal
The Eden Canal was built in 1904 (or earlier) from Kanchannagar to Jamalpur and was linked to the Damodar canals carrying water from Randiha weir in the thirties. It provides irrigation to 10,000 hectares of land in Barddhaman district.

Demographics
As per the 2011 Census of India Randiha had a total population of 1,953, of which 1,014 (52%) were males and 938 (47%) were females. Population below 6 years was 191. The total number of literates in Randiha was 1,274 (72.30% of the population over 6 years).

References

Purba Bardhaman district
Dams in West Bengal
Villages in Purba Bardhaman district